Mento is a style of Jamaican folk music that predates and has greatly influenced ska and reggae music. It is a fusion of African rhythmic elements and European elements, which reached peak popularity in the 1940s and 1950s. Mento typically features acoustic instruments, such as acoustic guitar, banjo, hand drums, and the rhumba box — a large mbira in the shape of a box that can be sat on while played. The rhumba box carries the bass part of the music.

Mento is often confused with calypso, a musical form from Trinidad and Tobago. Although the two share many similarities, they are separate and distinct musical forms. During the mid-20th century, mento was conflated with calypso, and mento was frequently referred to as calypso, kalypso and mento calypso. Mento singers frequently used calypso songs and techniques.  As in calypso, mento uses topical lyrics with a humorous slant, commenting on poverty and other social issues. Sexual innuendo is also common.

History
Mento draws on musical traditions brought by enslaved West Africa people. Enslaved musicians were often required to play music for their masters and often rewarded for such skills. The Africans created a creole music, incorporating such elements of these traditions, including quadrille, into their own folk music.

The Jamaican mento style has a long history of conflation with Trinidadian calypso. The lyrics of mento songs often deal with aspects of everyday life in a light-hearted and humorous way. Many comment on poverty, poor housing, and other social issues. Thinly veiled sexual references and innuendo are also common. Mento can be seen as a precursor of some of the movement motifs and themes dealing with such social issues found in modern dancehall. It became more popular in the late 1940s, with mento performances becoming a common aspect of dances, parties and other events in Jamaica.

The word mento is of uncertain etymology; it may be from an African language or Cuban Spanish; Rex Nettleford claimed the term was brought back from Cuba by Jamaicans returning from work there. Supposedly, it derives from the Spanish verb mentar, "to mention, call out, name", because of the subtle ways that lyrics criticised people (whether fellow blacks, or the whites who were in charge).

Major 1950s mento recording artists include Louise Bennett, Count Lasher, Harold Richardson, Lord Flea, Lord Fly, Alerth Bedasse with Chin's Calypso Sextet, Laurel Aitken, Denzil Laing, Lord Composer, Lord Lebby, Lord Power, Hubert Porter, and Harry Belafonte, a New Yorker of Jamaican origin. His wildly popular hit records in 1956-1958, including "Day-O (The Banana Boat Song)" and "Jamaica Farewell," were mento songs sold as calypso. Previously recorded Jamaican versions of many Belafonte's classic "calypso" hits can be heard on the Jamaica - Mento 1951-1958 CD released by Frémeaux & Associés in 2009.

Due in part to Belafonte's popularity, mento became widely conflated with calypso in the 1950s. In a 1957 interview for Calypso Star magazine, Lord Flea explained:
"In Jamaica, we call our music 'mento' until very recently. Today, 'calypso' is beginning to be used for all kinds of West Indian music. This is because it's become so commercialized there. Some people like to think of West Indians as carefree natives who work and sing and play and laugh their lives away. But this isn't so. Most of the people there are hard working folks, and many of them are smart business men. If the tourists want "calypso", that's what we sell them." 
This was the golden age of mento, as records pressed by Stanley Motta, Ivan Chin, Ken Khouri and others brought the music to a new audience. In the 1960s it became overshadowed by ska and reggae. Mento is still played in Jamaica, especially in areas frequented by tourists. Lloyd Bradley, reggae historian and author of the seminal reggae book, Bass Culture, said that Lee "Scratch" Perry’s seminal 1976 dub album, Super Ape, contained some of the purest mento influences he knew. This style of music was revived in popularity by the Jolly Boys in the late 1980s and early 1990s with the release of four recordings on First Warning Records/Rykodisc and a tour that included the United States. Stanley Beckford and Gilzene and the Blue Light Mento Band also revived rural mento in the 2000s. The mento dance is a Jamaican folk-form dance  with acoustic guitar, banjo, hand drums and rhumba box.

Films
 1984 - Caribbean Crucible. From Repercussions: A Celebration of African-American Music series, program 6. Directed by Dennis Marks and Geoffrey Haydon.

Sources

Further reading
 Floyd Jr, Samuel A (1999). "Black Music in the Circum-Caribbean". American Music, Vol. 17, No. 1 (Spring, 1999), pp. 1–38.
 Neely, Daniel (2001). "Long Time Gal! Mento is Back!". The Beat, December 2001, vol. 20, no. 6: 38-42. Available in pdf format at New York University homepages.
 Neely, Daniel (2007). "One of mento's great voices silenced". "Jamaica Observer, March 18, 2007,
 Neely, Daniel (2007). "Calling All Singers, Musicians and Speechmakers : Mento Aesthetics and Jamaica’s Early Recording Industry." Caribbean Quarterly, Vol. 53, No. 4. (December 2007), pp. 1–15.

External links
 Jamaica-Mento 1951-1958 - CD booklet online - (English version at the bottom of the page)
 Jamaica - In Calypso: A World Music, a site created by Historical Museum of Southern Florida about calypso and mento
 Jamaican Mento Music - site created by Michael Garnice (comprehensive information on the history and the musicians who made the music)
 Ivan Chin - Mento music's pages on mento pioneer Ivan Chin. The Mento dance is a Jamaican folk form dance  with the instruments acoustic guitar, banjo, hand drums and the rhumba box

 
Folk music genres